Sam McMillan may refer to:

 Sam Mac, Australian radio presenter
 Sammy J (born 1983), Australian comedian
 Sammy McMillan, association football player (Manchester United, Wrexham, Northern Ireland)